The Ruja is a right tributary of the river Siret in Romania. It flows into the Siret north of Pașcani.

References

Rivers of Romania
Rivers of Iași County